Jermaine Haley (born 25 August 1988) is an Australian professional wrestler. He is currently signed to WWE, where he performs on the Raw brand under the ring name Bronson Reed. He is a former NXT North American Champion.

Professional wrestling career

Early career (2007–2018)

Debuting in 2007 under the ring names Jonah Rock and J-Rock, he spent 11 years working throughout the Australian independent circuit. While wrestling in Australia, Rock earned numerous titles. He is a former three-time Wrestle Rampage Australian National Champion, former one-time Explosive Pro Wrestling Tag Team Champion, former one-time Pacific Pro Wrestling Heavyweight Championship, former one-time Heavyweight Champion, former one-time Professional Wrestling Alliance Heavyweight Champion and a former one-time Melbourne City Wrestling World Heavyweight Champion, one-time Intercommonwealth Champion and one-time Tag Team Champion.

Rock's early work was not limited to solely appearing in Australian promotions. He also appeared in Japan's Pro Wrestling NOAH promotion, the British promotions Revolution Pro Wrestling and PROGRESS Wrestling, the German promotion Westside Xtreme Wrestling and the American independent promotion Pro Wrestling Guerrilla.

WWE (2019–2021)
In January 2019, Haley's signing was announced along with 11 other recruits where he would report to the WWE's developmental territory NXT. On March 9, he would make his debut on an NXT live event wrestling under his real name losing to Riddick Moss. In June, his ring name was changed to Bronson Reed. On the July 17 episode of NXT, Reed made his official televised debut competing in the NXT Breakout Tournament as a face, where he defeated Dexter Lumis in the first round but was defeated by Cameron Grimes in the quarter-finals. On the August 21 episode of NXT, Reed was defeated by his former TMDK stablemate Shane Thorne.

Reaching 2020, on the February 5 episode of NXT, he was attacked by The Undisputed Era backstage after trying to come to the aid of Kushida. The following week, he challenged Roderick Strong to a match but was defeated. On the June 3 episode of NXT, Reed was defeated by Grimes. Following the match, he was attacked by Karrion Kross. On the June 17 episode of NXT, Reed defeated Leon Ruff and called out Kross challenging him to a match for the next week. The following week, Reed was defeated by Kross. Next, Reed would enter a short feud with newcomer L. A. Knight, defeating him in a singles match. After gaining momentum, he focused on the NXT North American Championship. At NXT: Takeover XXX in August, Reed was unsuccessful in winning the title.

In April 2021, on Night 1 of NXT Takeover: Stand & Deliver, Reed won a Six-man Gauntlet Eliminator match, to become the #1 contender for the North American Championship. On Night 2 of the event, Reed faced the reigning champion Johnny Gargano in a losing effort, but defeated him on the May 18 episode of NXT in a steel cage match to win the title, becoming the first Australian and non-American wrestler to hold the NXT North American Championship. At NXT TakeOver: In Your House, Reed teamed with the NXT Tag Team Champions, MSK to successfully defend their titles against Legado Del Fantasma in a winner take all match. On the June 29 episode of NXT, Reed dropped the title to Isaiah "Swerve" Scott after interference from Hit Row, ending his reign at 42 days. On the July 27 episode of NXT, Reed was defeated by Adam Cole in what would be his final WWE match in this stint. On August 6, Haley was released from his WWE contract.

New Japan Pro-Wrestling (2021–2022)
At Battle in the Valley on November 13, 2021, Haley, using the ring name Jonah, made his New Japan Pro-Wrestling (NJPW) debut, attacking FinJuice (David Finlay and Juice Robinson), establishing himself as a heel in the process. After his debut, Jonah would go on short lived winning streak defeating Lucas Riley in his NJPW in-ring debut and then a month later defeating David Finlay. On January 15, 2022, Jonah suffered his first NJPW loss in a tag team match against FinJuice as he teamed with Bad Dude Tito. On March 6, Shane Haste, assisted Jonah and Tito, in defeating FinJuice and reformed The Mighty Don't Kneel as a stable.

On June 12 during Dominion 6.12 in Osaka-jo Hall, Jonah was announced as a participant in the G1 Climax 32 tournament starting in July, as a part of the A block. Jonah scored 8 points in his block, narrowly missing out on a spot in the semi-finals. However, one of Jonah's wins was an upset victory over former IWGP World Heavyweight Champion and eventual tournament winner Kazuchika Okada.

Impact Wrestling (2021–2022)
At Turning Point on November 20, 2021, Jonah made his Impact Wrestling debut, attacking Josh Alexander and leaving him bloodied. They had a match at Hard To Kill, where Alexander defeated him. After his loss to Alexander, Jonah would embark on a winning streak defeating the likes of Crazzy Steve, Black Taurus, Raj Singh, and Honor No More's PCO. His winning streak would come to an end at Rebellion, after being defeated by Tomohiro Ishii. His final match was a loss to PCO in a Monster's Ball match. On May 6, Jonah announced his departure from the company.

Return to WWE (2022–present)
On the December 19, 2022, episode of Raw, Haley made his surprise return to WWE under his former ring name Bronson Reed, where he helped The Miz defeat Dexter Lumis in a ladder match. On the January 30, 2023 episode of Raw, Reed defeated Dolph Ziggler to qualify for the Elimination Chamber for the United States Championship. At Elimination Chamber on February 18, Reed failed to win the title inside the namesake structure.

Personal life
Haley is married to his high school sweetheart Paige, who made an appearance on NXT after he won the NXT North American Championship. He is of Samoan descent.

Championships and accomplishments
Explosive Pro Wrestling
EPW Tag Team Championship (1 time) – with Marcius Pitt
 International Wrestling Australia
 IWA Heavyweight Championship (1 time)
Melbourne City Wrestling
MCW Heavyweight Championship (1 time)
MCW Tag Team Championship (1 time) - with Hartley Jackson
MCW Intercommonwealth Championship (1 time)
Ballroom Brawl (2017)
Third Triple Crown Champion
NWA Australian Wrestling Alliance
NWA AWA Heavyweight Championship (1 time)
Queensland Double Crown Championship (1 time)
Pacific Pro Wrestling
PPW Heavyweight Championship (1 time)
Pro Wrestling Australia
PWA Heavyweight Championship (1 time)
 Pro Wrestling Illustrated
Ranked No. 73 of the top 500 singles wrestlers in the PWI 500 in 2021
Wrestle Rampage
WR Australian National Championship (3 times)
WR Meltdown World Tag Team Championships (1 time) - with Hartley Jackson
WWE
NXT North American Championship (1 time)

References

External links

 JONAH's Impact Wrestling profile

1988 births
Australian expatriate sportspeople in the United States
Australian male professional wrestlers
Australian sportspeople of Samoan descent
Expatriate professional wrestlers
Living people
Sportspeople from Adelaide
Sportsmen from South Australia
NXT North American Champions
21st-century professional wrestlers